Nationality words link to articles with information on the nation's poetry or literature (for instance, Irish or France).

Events
 Irish poet Tuileagna Ó Maoil Chonaire composes the poem Labhram ar iongnaibh Éireann.
 On the death of Pierre de Ronsard, Philippe Desportes became "recognized indisputably as France's greatest living poet," according to 20th century scholar Bernard Weinberg.

Works published
 Giordano Bruno, Italy:
 L’Infini de l’univers et les mondes
 De gli eroici furori ("The Heroic Enthusiasts"), a sonnet sequence and commentaries concerning the philosophy of love and love as a means of mystical ascent; dedicated to Sir Philip Sidney
 Cabala del Cavallo pegaseo

Births
 January 31 – Daniel Schwenter (died 1636), German Orientalist, polymath, poet and librarian
 March 16 – Gerbrand Bredero (died 1618), Dutch poet and playwright
 October 11 – Johann Heermann (died 1647), German poet and hymn writer
 November 1 – Jan Brożek (died 1652), Polish mathematician, astronomer, physician, poet, writer, musician and rector
 December 13 – William Drummond of Hawthornden (died 1649), Scottish poet
 Also:
 Elizabeth Cary, Viscountess Falkland, née Elizabeth Tanfield (died 1639), English poet, translator and dramatist
 Ján Filický born about this year (died 1623), Slovak poet
 Fang Weiyi (died 1668), Chinese woman poet

Deaths
 Paolo Giovio, birth year not known, Italian, Latin-language poet
 Ambrosius Lobwasser died (born 1515), German
 December 27 – Pierre de Ronsard (born 1524), French

See also

 Poetry
 16th century in poetry
 16th century in literature
 Dutch Renaissance and Golden Age literature
 Elizabethan literature
 French Renaissance literature
 Renaissance literature
 Spanish Renaissance literature
 University Wits

Notes

16th-century poetry
Poetry